Myrmelastes is a genus of passerine birds in the family Thamnophilidae. Most of these species were previously placed in the genus Schistocichla. The genus formerly included only three species, but several taxa previously considered subspecies of the spot-winged antbird have been elevated to species status.

The genus contains eight species:
 Plumbeous antbird (Myrmelastes hyperythrus)
 Slate-colored antbird (Myrmelastes schistacea)
 Spot-winged antbird (Myrmelastes leucostigma)
 Humaita antbird (Myrmelastes humaythae)
 Brownish-headed antbird (Myrmelastes brunneiceps)
 Rufous-faced antbird (Myrmelastes rufifacies)
 Roraiman antbird (Myrmelastes saturata)
 Caura antbird (Myrmelastes caurensis)

These species were formerly placed in the genus Schistocichla which had been erected by the American ornithologist W.E. Clyde Todd in 1927 with spot-winged antbird as the type species. A molecular phylogenetic study published in 2013 found that the plumbeous antbird which had previously been placed in the genus Myrmeciza was instead a member of a clade containing species in the genus Schistocichla. The plumbeous antbird was the type species of the genus Myrmelastes which had been introduced by the English zoologist Philip Sclater in 1858. This was much earlier than Schistocichla, Todd 1927, and had precedence.

The Humaita antbird, brownish-headed antbird, rufous-faced antbird and Roraiman antbird were formerly considered as subspecies of the spot-winged antbird. They were promoted to species status based on detailed studies of the plumage and vocal characteristics.

References

 
Bird genera
Taxa named by Philip Sclater
Taxonomy articles created by Polbot